Harly is a commune in the Aisne department in Hauts-de-France in northern France.

Geography

The commune is located in the valley of the Homblières, it is bathed by the Somme and its marshes and Streaming of Harly.

History
 Latin name: Harcliacum
 Carved flints were found in the town.
 Village of former Vermandois, the stewardship of Amiens, bailages and election of Saint-Quentin, Diocese of Noyon.

By the end of the tenth century, 943, mention is made of super Harli Harly Somenam fluvium in the relationship miracles relics of Saint Quentin.

In the 17th century, Harly, possession of the Chapter of St. Quentin at the outset, is Seigneurerie de l'Abbaye de Vermand.

The municipality had a bunker that belonged to the Hindenburg Line (WWI).

Population

Administration
List of successive mayors :

 René Lamy - Party : PS
 René Horb - Party : PS
 Bernard Destombes

Places of interest
 Saint-Martin church, dated from the 17th century, destroyed during the First World War and rebuilt around 1926.
 Monument to deaths in the First and Second world wars.
 Calvary located on rue Quentin-de-la Tour.
 Daltroff factory and worker accommodation next to the factory, built in 1875.
 Château d'Harly (important bourgeois house), destroyed during the First World War.
 A Merovingian cemetery, containing around 700 graves.

Notable people
Lords of the town (Source Genealogy Aisne)

 1218  Adam Harly
 1241-1248 Godard of Harly
 14?? Jean de Fosseux
 14?? Philippe de Fosseux, often used the last name Borgne
 1734-1811 Joseph Dufermont, parish priest and member of the National Assembly.
 192?-2019 André Triou, historian
 Jean-Marie Lefèvre (born 1953), modernist and minimalist poet

See also
 Communes of the Aisne department

References

Communes of Aisne
Aisne communes articles needing translation from French Wikipedia